Evgeni Alexandrovich Pechurov (born 27 August 1966) is a Russian judoka.

Achievements

External links 

1966 births
Living people
Russian male judoka
Goodwill Games medalists in judo
Competitors at the 1994 Goodwill Games
20th-century Russian people